Jeavons may refer to:

 Aaron Jeavons (born 1989), English cricketer
 Billy Jeavons (1912–1992), English footballer
 Colin Jeavons (born 1929), Welsh actor
 Enoch Jeavons (1893–1967), English cricketer
 Jean Jeavons (born 1956), British swimmer
 Nick Jeavons (born 1957), English rugby player

See also
 Jeavons syndrome
 Re Jeavons, ex parte Mackay, insolvency law case
 Jevons (disambiguation)